The 2017 Tour de Yorkshire was a three-day cycling stage race staged in Yorkshire over 28–30 April 2017. It was the third edition of the Tour de Yorkshire, organised by Welcome to Yorkshire and the Amaury Sport Organisation.

The race was won by  rider Serge Pauwels of Belgium, after a strong performance from his team on the hilly final stage; Jacques Janse van Rensburg set Pauwels up for an attack on the Wigtwizzle climb and he went clear while Omar Fraile manned the chase group in support. After Pauwels had pulled out a gap, Fraile attacked and joined up with his team captain, setting up a tandem victory salute at the finish at Fox Valley in Stocksbridge, Sheffield. Pauwels won the race by six seconds over Fraile, while 's Jonathan Hivert completed the podium, one second further behind Fraile.

Route

On 25 October 2016, the start and finish locations for the event were released: these were Bridlington, Scarborough, Tadcaster, Harrogate, Bradford and Sheffield.

The stage routes were released on 2 December 2016. The routes were Bridlington to Scarborough, Tadcaster to Harrogate and Bradford to Sheffield. The women's race was to be held on Saturday 29 April, over the Tadcaster to Harrogate route.

Teams
18 teams were selected to take part in Tour de Yorkshire. Seven of these were UCI WorldTeams, with five UCI Professional Continental teams, five UCI Continental teams and a Great Britain national team. Teams could enter between five and eight riders.

Stages

Stage 1
28 April 2017 — Bridlington to Scarborough,

Stage 2
29 April 2017 — Tadcaster to Harrogate,

Stage 3
30 April 2017 — Bradford to Sheffield,

Classification leadership table
In the 2017 Tour de Yorkshire, four different jerseys were awarded. The general classification was calculated by adding each cyclist's finishing times on each stage. Time bonuses were awarded to the first three finishers on all stages: the stage winner won a ten-second bonus, with six and four seconds for the second and third riders respectively. Bonus seconds were also awarded to the first three riders at intermediate sprints; three seconds for the winner of the sprint, two seconds for the rider in second and one second for the rider in third. The leader of the general classification received a light blue and yellow jersey. This classification was considered the most important of the 2017 Tour de Yorkshire, and the winner of the classification was considered the winner of the race.

The second classification was the points classification. Riders were awarded points for finishing in the top ten in a stage. Unlike in the points classification in the Tour de France, the winners of all stages were awarded the same number of points. Points were also won in intermediate sprints; five points for crossing the sprint line first, three points for second place and one for third. The leader of the points classification was awarded a green jersey.

There was also a mountains classification, for which points were awarded for reaching the top of a climb before other riders. Each climb was categorised the same, with four points awarded to the first rider over the top of each climb. Two points were awarded for the second-placed rider, with one point for third place. The leadership of the mountains classification was marked by a pink jersey.

Another jersey was awarded at the end of each stage. This was a combativity prize and was awarded to the rider who "made the greatest effort and [...] demonstrated the best qualities in terms of sportsmanship". A jury selected a list of riders to be eligible for the prize; the winner of the prize was then decided by a vote on Twitter. The rider was awarded a grey jersey. There was also a classification for teams, in which the times of the best three cyclists in a team on each stage were added together; the leading team at the end of the race was the team with the lowest cumulative time.

References

External links

 

2017 in English sport
2017 UCI Europe Tour
2017